Putt can refer to:

 Putt (golf), golf stroke
 Putt (surname)
 Putt baronets, a title in the Baronetage of England
 Pitch and putt, sport similar to golf
 Miniature golf, also known as mini-putt or putt-putt

See also
 Put (disambiguation)
 Putt-Putt (disambiguation)
 Putte (disambiguation)